The Hortus Sanitatis (also written Ortus; Latin for The Garden of Health), a Latin natural history encyclopaedia, was published by Jacob Meydenbach in Mainz, Germany in 1491.

It describes species in the natural world along with their medicinal uses and modes of preparation. It followed the Latin Herbarius moguntinus (1484) and the German Gart der Gesundheit (1485), that Peter Schöffer had published in Mainz. Unlike these earlier works, besides dealing with herbs, the Hortus sanitatis deals with animals, birds, fish and stones too. Moreover the author does not restrict himself to dealing only with real creatures, but also includes accounts of mythical animals such as the dragon, harpy, hydra, myrmecoleon, phoenix, and zitiron.

Author 
The author is unknown. Occasionally the Frankfurt physician Johann Wonnecke von Kaub is incorrectly named as the author.

Contents 
Set in two columns, the work contains five sections describing simple drugs used for therapy:
 De Herbis with 530 chapters on herbs.
 De Animalibus with 164 chapters on land animals (Chapter 1: De homo).
 De Avibus with 122 chapters on birds and other airworthy animals.
 De Piscibus with 106 chapters on aquatic animals.
 De Lapidibus with 144 chapters on semi-precious stones, ores and minerals.
 As appendix a treatise on uroscopy and several detailed registers.

Set in two columns, each chapter is headed by a picture. The following text gives a general description of the related simple drug and under the title of »oparetiones« a list of its effects on the human body.

The plants of the section "De Herbis" were determined by B. and H. Baumann (2010, pp. 205-222) according to current binominal nomenclature.

Sources 
The author has composed the Hortus sanitatis out of well-known medieval encyclopaedias, such as the Liber pandectarum medicinae omnia medicine simplicia continens of Matthaeus Silvaticus (14th c.) and the Speculum natural of Vincent of Beauvais (13th century).

Publication history
 Incunabule 
 Mainz. Jacob Meydenbach (June 23) 1491 
 Strasbourg. Anonymous 1496
 Strasbourg. Anonymous 1497-1498  (with woodcuts from the workshop of Johann Grüninger, which were also used to illustrate the Kleines Destillierbuch of Hieronymus Brunschwig (1500).
 Strasbourg. Anonymous 1499 (Johann Prüß der Ältere?)
 Paris. Antoine Vérard 1500 Ortus sanitatis translate de latin en françois 

 16th century 
 Strasbourg after 1500  (with woodcuts from the workshop of Hans Grüninger).
 Venice (Bernhardinus Benalius and John de Cereto de Tridino) 1511 (4th reprint: Venice 1611); Reprint (in two volumes) Würzburg 1978.
 Strasbourg 1517 
 Paris 1539 Phillipe le Noir Le jardin de santé 

 Sections two to five of the Hortus sanitatis (section one – herbs – lacking). Latin 
 Strasbourg. Matthias Apiarius 1536 

 Sections two to five of the Hortus sanitatis (section one – herbs – lacking). German 
 Straßburg 1529. Hans Grüninger
 Straßburg 1529. Balthasar Beck. Gart der gesuntheit. zu latin …
 Straßburg 1536. Mathias Apiarius. Gart der gesuntheit zů latein …
 Frankfurt 1556. Hermann Gülfferich. Gart der Gesundtheyt Zu Latein …

A facsimile edition of this was published in London in 1954 by B. Quaritch.

Illustrations
The woodcut illustrations are stylised but often easily recognizable, and many were re-used in other works. In addition to the representations of simples, pictures show their use by humans, and scenes in which figures are surrounded by the subjects in their natural environment, such as standing by a river with fish and mermaids.

Illustrations. Mainz 1491

In culture
The University of Sydney comments that "The rich variety of the woodcuts makes this a very attractive book. The engraver was a skilled craftsman, but there is some botanical retrogression, since he did not always fully understand the plants he was copying from previous cuts."

A copy once owned by the apothecary George Pavius of Aberdeen is held by the University of Aberdeen.

References

Citations

Bibliography
 Arber, Agnes. Herbals. Their origin and evolution. A chapter in the History of Botany 1470-1670. Cambridge University Press, 1912, pp. 25-34: The Hortus sanitatis (Digitalisat)

 Baumann, Brigitte and Baumann, Helmut: Die Mainzer Kräuterbuch-Inkunabeln – „Herbarius Moguntinus“ (1484) – „Gart der Gesundheit“ (1485) – „Hortus Sanitatis (1491).“ Wissenschaftshistorische Untersuchungen der drei Prototypen botanisch-medizinischer Leiteratur des Spätmittelalters.. Anton Hiersemann, Stuttgart 2010, pp. 177–222: Hortus sanitatis, Mainz, 23. Juni 1491 
 Fischer, Hermann. Mittelalterliche Pflanzenkunde. Verlag der Münchner Drucke, München 1929, pp. 94–109: Der große Hortus sanitatis (Mainz 1491)

External links

Hortus Sanitatis (1485)
Hortus Sanitatis (1491)
 Ortus Sanitatis published 23 June 1491. A copy with coloured illustrations in Cambridge Digital Library
 Ortus sanitatis 4th edition; 3rd Strasbourg edition. Published 1499 by J. Prüss in Strasbourg. Digitised copy in Boston Public Library
 Hortus sanitatis. Book IV. De Piscibus

Herbals